MDOC or mDOC may refer to:

 Maine Department of Corrections
 Massachusetts Department of Corrections
 Michigan Department of Corrections
 Mississippi Department of Corrections
 Missouri Department of Corrections
 mDOC, a flash memory module standard by M-Systems
 , a macro set for man pages